Tabanus punctifer, the western horse fly, is a species of horse fly in the family Tabanidae. This species of horse fly is approximately 20.5 mm (0.8 in) long. They are typically found throughout the southern and western parts of the United States. They can be found between Utah and Mexico, and between California and Texas. The thorax is covered with long hairs that give it a creamy white color, while the abdomen is completely black. Much like other horse fly species, the Tabanus punctifer female requires a blood meal for the development of their eggs. Females will bite horses, livestock, and humans, making them vectors of disease for pathogens and parasites.

Distribution
Canada, United States.

References

Tabanidae
Insects described in 1876
Taxa named by Carl Robert Osten-Sacken
Diptera of North America